Sarah Blacher Cohen (June 11, 1936 in Appleton, Wisconsin, – November 10, 2008 in Albany, New York) was an American writer, scholar, and playwright, and a professor at SUNY Albany for 30 years.  Her area of specialty was Jewish American fiction. Her published books include Comic Relief: Humor in Contemporary American Literature, Saul Bellow's Enigmatic Laughter (1974), and Cynthia Ozick's Comic Art: From Levity to Liturgy.  She edited From Hester Street to Hollywood: The Jewish-American Stage and Screen (Jewish Literature and Culture Series), Making a Scene: The Contemporary Drama of Jewish-American Women, and Jewish Wry: Essays on Jewish Humor.  Her plays include The Ladies Locker Room,  and Molly Picon's Return Engagement, a biographical play with music on the star of Yiddish theater. She collaborated with Joanne Koch, starting in 1989 on Sophie, Totie, and Belle, a musical on performers Sophie Tucker, Totie Fields, and Belle Barth. 'She and Joanne Koch also co-authored the plays Danny Kaye: Supreme Court Jester, Soul Sisters, Henrietta Szold: Woman of Valor, an adaptation of Saul Bellow stories entitled Saul Bellow's Stories Onstage: The Old System and a Silver Dish, and the multicultural musical Soul Sisters. Cohen and Koch co-edited an anthology of ten plays Shared Stages: Ten American Dramas of Blacks and Jews, including Driving Miss Daisy, Fires in the Mirror, and Soul Sisters. She collaborated with Isaac Bashevis Singer on the off-Broadway play Schlemiel the First.  Cohen also gave talks and delivered papers, including "The Unkosher Comediennes: From Sophie Tucker to Joan Rivers." Her husband was Gary Cohen. She died of Charcot-Marie-Tooth disease on November 10, 2008 age 72.

References

External links
 Plays by Joanne Koch & Sarah Blacker
 New York Times review of Sophie, Totie and Belle
 New York Times review of Schlemiel The First
 Ezra Cappell (University of Texas, El Paso) "Sarah Blacher Cohen's Comic Drama of Disability" Jewish Women's Writing of the 1990s and Beyond - Abstract
 Comments from Cohen from a Philadelphia Inquirer article "Is 'Borat' Funny or a Hate Film?" (November 14, 2006)
 Bookfinder.com listing of Sarah Blacher Cohen
 Times Union obituary notice for Sarah Blacher Cohen

1936 births
2008 deaths
20th-century American dramatists and playwrights
American book editors
Neurological disease deaths in New York (state)
Writers from Appleton, Wisconsin
University at Albany, SUNY faculty
American women dramatists and playwrights
20th-century American women writers
American women academics
21st-century American women